Stranska Vas may refer to several places in Slovenia: 

Stranska Vas, Dobrova–Polhov Gradec, a settlement in the Municipality of Dobrova–Polhov Gradec
Stranska Vas, Grosuplje, a hamlet of Brvace in the Municipality of Grosuplje
Stranska Vas, Novo Mesto, a settlement in the Municipality of Novo Mesto
Stranska Vas ob Višnjici, a settlement in the Municipality of Ivančna Gorica
Stranska Vas pri Semiču, a settlement in the Municipality of Semič 
Stranska Vas pri Žužemberku, a hamlet of Žužemberk in the Municipality of Žužemberk